Agoura Hills is a city in the Santa Monica Mountains region of Los Angeles County, California, United States. Its population was 20,330 at the 2010 census, which decreased to 
20,299 in 2020. It is in the eastern Conejo Valley between the Simi Hills and the Santa Monica Mountains. The city is in western Los Angeles County and is bordered to the north by Bell Canyon and Ventura County. Agoura Hills and unincorporated Agoura sit next to Calabasas, Oak Park, and Westlake Village.

History
The area was first settled by the Chumash Native Americans around 10,000 years ago. The Alta California (Upper California) coast was settled by Spanish Franciscan missionaries in the late 18th century.

In about 1800, Miguel Ortega was granted a Spanish grazing concession called Rancho Las Virgenes or El Rancho de Nuestra Señora La Reina de Las Virgenes. The grant was abandoned after Ortega's death in 1810, and José Maria Dominguez was given Rancho Las Virgenes as a Mexican land grant in 1834. Maria Antonia Machado de Reyes purchased the rancho from Dominguez in 1845. (The "Reyes Adobe" ranch headquarters sits today in central Agoura Hills, where it is part of the Reyes Adobe Museum built around 2004 and owned by the Los Angeles County Parks and Recreation Department.)

By 1900, the area was being used as a popular stage stop for travelers because of its natural spring.

In the 1920s, the community was briefly known as Picture City, as Paramount Pictures owned a ranch known as Paramount Ranch used for filming Westerns. To obtain a post office of their own, the residents were required to choose a one-word name, and in 1927 chose the shortest name proposed: a misspelling of the last name of Pierre Agoure, a local Basque man and French immigrant who had settled in the area in 1871 to live the lifestyle of the Mexican rancher. Styling himself Don Pierre Agoure, he was a successful sheep herder and had a reputation as a swashbuckler.

Agoura began to grow in the late 1960s after the Ventura Freeway section of U.S. Route 101 was built through the area, dividing the community into northern and southern sections. The first housing tracts in Agoura were Hillrise, Liberty Canyon and Lake Lindero. Rapid growth continued during the 1970s, when schools were built and much of downtown erected.

In 1982, the residents of the proposed city voted in favor of cityhood by a 68% majority. Agoura Hills became the 83rd City in Los Angeles County. Elected to the first City Council were Mayor Fran Pavley, Mayor Pro Tem Carol Sahm, Councilmembers Ernest Dynda, John Hood, and Vicky Leary. Incorporating a year after neighboring Westlake Village, the drive for cityhood in the region was largely based on public discontent with the county's failure to limit residential development of the area, motives that influenced Calabasas to follow suit in 1991.

The 1980s was a period of growth, with large land areas being subdivided into housing tracts. In the 1990s, businesses set up shop in the downtown including shops and restaurants.

In 1995, the murder of Jimmy Farris (the infamous Brandon Hein case) awakened the city to a rising drug problem and petty theft by its young. As a result, the city began sponsoring live music competitions and concerts in local parks.

In November 2018, the Woolsey Fire occurred during Santa Ana winds burning through the community. One victim was found on Tuesday November 13 in the 32000 block of Lobo Canyon Road.

Music
Agoura Hills is known regionally for its live music scene and originality in the nu metal scene, a fame that has given rise to such acts as Linkin Park, Dub Thompson, Skye Aspen, Incubus, Hoobastank, and Fort Minor.

Agoura Hills is home to The Canyon Club, a concert venue that hosts touring acts such as Peter Frampton, Smash Mouth, Pat Benatar, Cyndi Lauper, REO Speedwagon, X, Steel Pulse, The New Cars, Asia, Boyz II Men, Alan Parsons, Foreigner, Bret Michaels and The Smithereens.

Geography

Agoura Hills has a mountain called Ballard Mountain named after pioneer settler and freed slave John Ballard. The name of the mountain was officially changed from Negrohead to Ballard in a ceremony on February 20, 2010.

Agoura Hills is called the "Gateway to the Santa Monica Mountains National Recreation Area". The city is unofficially divided into a number of varied districts centered on the modern Downtown area of the city. The most notable of these districts include Morrison Ranch, Downtown, Forest Cove, South End, Malibu Junction, East Agoura, and Old Agoura.

Environment

Natural areas of Agoura Hills are part of the California chaparral and woodlands ecoregion and are covered by hundreds of local plant species, some of which are very rare, and others of which have become popular ornamentals. The range is host to an immense variety of wildlife, from mountain lions to the endangered Southern California Distinct Population Segment of steelhead. The mountain lion population within the Santa Monica Mountains (which includes the Simi Hills & Santa Susana Pass) is severely depleted with only seven known living adult individuals. The primary cause of the decline is due to a combination of traffic related mortality (three from the area were killed within a matter of months,) anti-coagulants ingested from human poisoned prey (two individuals within the Simi Hills) and attacks by other, more dominant mountain lions (an elder male, known as P1, killed both his son and his mate, this is thought to be due to a lack of space available.) The Wallis Annenberg Wildlife Crossing is a proposed vegetated overpass spanning the Ventura Freeway and Agoura Road at Liberty Canyon on the east end of the city. Snakes are common but only occasionally seen. Local species include the Southern Pacific Rattlesnake (the only venomous species), Mountain Kingsnake, California Kingsnake, Gopher snake, and Garter snake. The mountains are also home to the Western fence lizard.

Invasive species
In 2010, the Los Angeles Times reported that the New Zealand mud snail had infested watersheds in the Santa Monica Mountains, posing serious threats to native species and complicating efforts to improve stream-water quality for the endangered steelhead trout. According to the article, the snails have expanded "from the first confirmed sample in Medea Creek in Agoura Hills to nearly 30 other stream sites in four years." Researchers at the Santa Monica Bay Restoration Commission believe that the snails' expansion may have been expedited after the mollusks traveled from stream to stream on the gear of contractors and volunteers.

Climate

Demographics

2010
At the 2010 census Agoura Hills had a population of 20,330. The racial makeup of Agoura Hills was 17,147 (84.3%) White, (78.6% Non-Hispanic White), 267 (1.3%) African American, 51 (0.3%) Native American, 1,521 (7.5%) Asian, 24 (0.1%) Pacific Islander, 590 (2.9%) from other races, and 730 (3.6%) from two or more races. Hispanic or Latino of any race were 1,936 persons (9.5%).

The census reported that 20,242 people (99.6% of the population) lived in households, 15 (0.1%) lived in non-institutionalized group quarters, and 73 (0.4%) were institutionalized.

There were 7,327 households, 2,799 (38.2%) had children under the age of 18 living in them, 4,565 (62.3%) were opposite-sex married couples living together, 726 (9.9%) had a female householder with no husband present, 302 (4.1%) had a male householder with no wife present. There were 263 (3.6%) unmarried opposite-sex partnerships, and 36 (0.5%) same-sex married couples or partnerships. 1,346 households (18.4%) were one person and 438 (6.0%) had someone living alone who was 65 or older. The average household size was 2.76. There were 5,593 families (76.3% of households); the average family size was 3.15.

The age distribution was 4,904 people (24.1%) under the age of 18, 1,582 people (7.8%) aged 18 to 24, 4,465 people (22.0%) aged 25 to 44, 7,089 people (34.9%) aged 45 to 64, and 2,290 people (11.3%) who were 65 or older. The median age was 42.4 years. For every 100 females, there were 97.2 males. For every 100 females age 18 and over, there were 94.6 males.

There were 7,585 housing units at an average density of 969.7 per square mile, of the occupied units 5,715 (78.0%) were owner-occupied and 1,612 (22.0%) were rented. The homeowner vacancy rate was 0.5%; the rental vacancy rate was 6.8%. 16,111 people (79.2% of the population) lived in owner-occupied housing units and 4,131 people (20.3%) lived in rental housing units. The median household income was $107,885, according to the 2010 United States Census, with 7.1% of the population living below the federal poverty line.

2000
At the 2000 census there were 20,537 people in 6,874 households, including 5,588 families, in the city. The population density was 2,511.8 inhabitants per square mile (969.4/km2). The racial makeup of the city was 86.96% White, 1.32% Black or African American, 0.25% Native American, 6.50% Asian, 0.10% Pacific Islander, 2.09% from other races, and 2.78% from two or more races. 6.85% of the population were Hispanic or Latino of any race.

Of the 6,874 households 47.3% had children under the age of 18 living with them, 67.7% were married couples living together, 9.9% had a female householder with no husband present, and 18.7% were non-families. 13.8% of households were one person and 3.0% were one person aged 65 or older. The average household size was 2.98 and the average family size was 3.30.

The age distribution was 30.5% under the age of 18, 6.3% from 18 to 24, 27.6% from 25 to 44, 29.4% from 45 to 64, and 6.2% 65 or older. The median age was 38 years. For every 100 females, there were 99.1 males. For every 100 females age 18 and over, there were 94.0 males.

Economy

Top employers
According to the city's 2020 Comprehensive Annual Financial Report, the top employers in the city are:

Government
Agoura Hills is governed by a City Council/City Manager form of government. A five-member City Council is elected by the residents to oversee city operations and guide the development of the community. Councilmembers are elected to four-year terms. The terms are staggered so that a measure of continuity is maintained from one Council to the next. The role of Mayor rotates among the Councilmembers. The Mayor is chosen by the City Councilmembers to serve a one-year term. The City Manager is appointed by the City Council to supervise the administrative personnel and contract services.

As of April 2022 the Agoura Hills City Council consists of Deborah Klein Lopez (Mayor), Chris Anstead (Mayor Pro Tem), Linda Northrup, Illece Buckley Weber and Denis Weber. The City Manager is Nathan Hamburger and the city attorney is contracted through RWG Law.

State and federal representation

Infrastructure
Las Virgenes Water District serves Agoura Hills along with Westlake Village and other parts of western Los Angeles County. State water provided by the Metropolitan Water District of Southern California is the sole source used by the district.

The Los Angeles County Sheriff's Department (LASD) operates the Malibu/Lost Hills Station in Calabasas, serving Agoura Hills.

The United States Postal Service Agoura Hills Post Office is located at 5158 Clareton Drive.

Education

The Las Virgenes Unified School District serves Agoura Hills.
 Sumac Elementary School
 Willow Elementary School
 Yerba Buena Elementary School
 Lindero Canyon Middle School
 Agoura High School
 Indian Hills High School

Sports
Agoura Hills is the corporate headquarters of the Los Angeles Rams since 2016.

Events
Agoura Hills is home to the Great Race of Agoura Hills, an annual running event held at Chumash Park in Agoura Hills in March of every year. The Great Race was established in 1986 and features six races including Pacific Half (half-marathon), Chesebro Half (half-marathon), Old Agoura 10K, Deena Kastor (5 kilometers), Kids 1 Mile, and the Family Fun Run (1 mile). The Chesebro Half was voted best half-marathon in the U.S. in 2011.

Notable people 

 Erin Brockovich, environmental activist
 Kirk Cameron, actor
 Brooke Candy, artist and musician
 Paul Carroll, volleyball player and coach
 Rob Chiarelli, multiple Grammy Award winner
 Guillermo del Toro, Mexican film director, lived in Agoura Hills for a few years.
 Jason Falkner, musician
 Foxygen, band
 Chelsey Goldberg (born 1993), ice hockey player
Leo Gallagher, known as Gallagher, American comedian
 Ron Goldman, waiter and deceased friend of Nicole Brown Simpson
 Heather Graham, actress
 Johnny Gyro, seven-time karate world champion (owns studio in Oak Park, CA)
 Skip Hicks, former UCLA running back and NFL and CFL football player
 Warren Hill, jazz musician
 Deena Kastor, Olympic medalist/American marathon record holder
 Grant Kirkhope, composer
 Hayley Kiyoko, singer, songwriter, actress, and dancer
 Taylor Lautner, actor
 Linkin Park, band
 Mike Shinoda, musician from alternative rock group Linkin Park
 Brad Delson, musician from alternative rock group Linkin Park
 Casey Matthews, NFL linebacker for the Philadelphia Eagles
 Clay Matthews, NFL linebacker for the Green Bay Packers
 Tia Mowry, model and actress
 Harry Nilsson, singer-songwriter
 Terri Nunn, musician from new wave group Berlin, actress, radio host
 Rob Paulsen, voice actor
 Russell Peters, comedian
 Alisan Porter, actress, & singer, winner of 10th season of The Voice
 Doug Robb, singer from post-grunge group Hoobastank
 Ray Romano, comedian
 Todd Steussie, NFL offensive lineman
 Robert Stock (born 1989), Major League Baseball player
 Elias Toufexis, film, television and voice actor
 Jason Wade, singer and musician
 Rainn Wilson, film and television actor
 Matthew Wolff, professional golfer
 Mark L. Young, actor

References

External links

 

 
Cities in Los Angeles County, California
Incorporated cities and towns in California
Agoura Hills
Conejo Valley
Populated places in the Santa Monica Mountains
Simi Hills
1982 establishments in California
Populated places established in 1982